Zgornje Jablane is a settlement in northeastern Slovenia. It belongs to the Municipality of Kidričevo. The area is part of the traditional region of Styria. It is now included with the rest of the municipality in the Drava Statistical Region.

References

External links
Zgornje Jablane on Geopedia

Populated places in the Municipality of Kidričevo